Since the inception of the flagship Cartoon Network and its sister networks in the United States, its various parent companies over the last 30-plus years have launched international versions of Cartoon Network and those other brands.

Cartoon Network

Background 
Cartoon Network Europe, a pan-European English feed, was launched in 1993. Spanish, Swedish, Danish, French, Italian, and Norwegian audio tracks were added in 1994. The network's Dutch feed was launched in 1997. Another feed launched in 1998, which aired in France, Italy and Spain. The pan-European feed kept airing in the other parts of Europe. The network's Italian feed became independent a few months later after the launch of the French channel, while the Spanish and French feeds were split in 1999. A Polish feed launched a year earlier, in 1998.

On September 17, 1993, some Russian cities began receiving Cartoon Network Europe through broadcasts from the Astra satellite. The channel broadcast in English.
Since July 1, 1996, the channel has been available from the Panamsat 4 satellite in the territories of Southern Russia and Ukraine, in the Asian republics of the former USSR. In 1997, the channel's new distributor, Chello Zone, took over in the CIS . In the same year, the channel was partially dubbed into Russian.
In 1998, the channel began broadcasting on the territories of Belarus and Ukraine, the Baltic states and the North-West of Russia from the Astra 1G satellite. Broadcasting was 16 hours a day, from 8:00 to 0:00 MSK., at night, the channel carried Turner Classic Movies. In November 1999, the channel became available on the platform NTV Plus and other cable networks, broadcasting from the Sirius 2 satellite.

In 1999, the network's British feed officially split off from the pan-European version. This followed after the shared transponder analogue feed on Astra 1C became scrambled with VideoCrypt and the short-lived British version of TNT was launched.

A Nordic feed was launched in 2000, broadcasting in Swedish, Norwegian, Danish and English. This also became available in Iceland and Finland. The Dutch Cartoon Network closed down in 2001. It was replaced with the pan-European feed in 2001. A Dutch audio track was simultaneously added. Greek subtitles became available the same year. The Polish feed branched into separate ones for Romania and Hungary in 2002. A German feed was launched in 2006. A Turkish feed was added in 2008.

In April 2005, Cartoon Network Europe was completely dubbed into Russian.

On October 1, 2008, a separate feed of Cartoon Network was created for Hungary and Romania, while the two additional audio tracks that were previously added to Cartoon Network Poland in 2002. Czech Republic and Slovakia both used to receive this channel feed in an English-language muted audio track..

On October 1, 2009, the channel was launched - Cartoon Network (Russia), broadcasting in the countries of CIS and South-Eastern Europe

The network's Arabic feed launched in 2010. This is the only EMEA-marketed feed not broadcast in English. On November 17, 2010, the Dutch feed relaunched and started broadcasting 24 hours a day and with a new logo. All programs and ads air in Dutch. The Spanish feed shut down in 2013, together with the Spanish Cartoonito. The Spanish feed relaunched as part of Latin America in August 2013. This market can still watch Cartoon Network on Boing, The African Portuguese feed was launched in 2013 in Angola and Mozambique. It launched in Portugal in the same year.

, the ex pan-European feed still airs in the Greek part of Cyprus; it is also one of the four feeds available in the Middle East and Africa (the other ones being the Arabic, French, and Portuguese feeds). This pan-European feed broadcasts in English, while Greek subtitles are available. All other European countries have their own local feed.

On September 1, 2017, the Central and Eastern European channel feed added a Czech-language audio track for its audience in the Czech Republic and Slovakia, replacing the English-language muted audio track.

Channels

Adult Swim

Boomerang

Boing

Cartoonito

Toonami

Other channels 

Note: In Italy and the UK, the network's "+1" timeshift channels are often temporarily rebranded and carry only one franchise for around a month, such as Looney Tunes, Tom & Jerry and Ben 10.

See also 
Discovery Kids, a group of formerly competing networks under Discovery, Inc. and now with two networks in Latin America and India under common ownership.

References

External links 
 List of international sites at the official American website of Cartoon Network

Cartoon Network
Adult Swim
Boomerang (TV network)
Boing (TV channel)
Cartoonito
Cartoon Network-related lists
Warner Bros. Discovery-related lists